Angela Daigle (born May 28, 1976, in San Francisco, California) is an American sprinter. She graduated from Fresno State University in 1999 and competed for the Fresno State Bulldogs team.

Together with Muna Lee, Me'Lisa Barber and Lauryn Williams she won a gold medal in 4 x 100 metres relay at the 2005 World Championships in Athletics. She had previously won a relay gold medal at the 2003 Pan American Games.

She was the American national champion in the 60-meter dash in 2005.

Personal bests
100 metres - 11.23 (2003)
200 metres - 22.59 (2004)

References

External

1976 births
Living people
Track and field athletes from San Francisco
American female sprinters
African-American female track and field athletes
Pan American Games gold medalists for the United States
Pan American Games medalists in athletics (track and field)
Athletes (track and field) at the 2003 Pan American Games
World Athletics Championships athletes for the United States
World Athletics Championships medalists
Fresno State Bulldogs women's track and field athletes
USA Indoor Track and Field Championships winners
World Athletics Championships winners
Medalists at the 2003 Pan American Games
21st-century African-American sportspeople
21st-century African-American women
20th-century African-American sportspeople
20th-century African-American women